A 24-pounder is a gun firing a shot of 24 pounds weight, a mass of .

Examples include:

24-pounder long gun, including various designs of artillery used during the Age of Sail
M1841 24-pounder howitzer, used by the United States Army from 1841 to 1865
A size of Dahlgren gun used during the American Civil War